The Lianyungang–Zhenjiang high-speed railway is a high-speed railway in China.

History
In November 2014, construction was expected to take 4.5 years.

The section from Lianyungang to Huai'an opened on 16 December 2019. The remainder was expected to open on 3 December 2020, however this did not go ahead. It opened on 11 December.

Route
Heading south from Lianyungang, the railway splits from the Qingdao–Yancheng railway after Dongji and continues south, serving Guanyun, Guannan, and Lianshui. The line meets the Xuzhou–Yancheng high-speed railway at Huai'an East but splits again to continue south. Three stations follow: Baoying, Gaoyou North, and Gaoyou. From the north, both east and west connections to the Nanjing–Qidong railway are provided, but no connection is provided from the south. The line then serves Yangzhou East. The line then passes over the Wufengshan Yangtze River Bridge before heading west and serving Dagang South. At its southern terminus Dantu, the line joins the Shanghai–Nanjing intercity railway.

Stations

References

High-speed railway lines in China
Railway lines opened in 2019